Leucopelargonidin is a colorless chemical compound related to leucoanthocyanins. It can be found in Albizia lebbeck (East Indian walnut), in the fruit of Anacardium occidentale (Cashew), in the fruit of Areca catechu (Areca nut), in the fruit of Hydnocarpus wightiana (Hindi Chaulmoogra), in the rhizome of Rumex hymenosepalus (Arizona dock), in Zea mays (Corn) and in Ziziphus jujuba (Chinese date).

(+)-Leucopelargonidin can be synthesized from (+)-aromadendrin by sodium borohydride reduction.

Metabolism
Dihydrokaempferol 4-reductase uses cis-3,4-leucopelargonidin and NADP+ to produce (+)-aromadendrin, NADPH, and H+.

Leucoanthocyanidin reductase transforms cis-3,4-leucopelargonidin into afzelechin.

References

External links
 Leucopelargonidin and leucocyanidin biosynthesis pathways on biocyc.org

Leucoanthocyanidins
Resorcinols